Nicole Tan Lee Koon is a Malaysian politician and currently serves as Negeri Sembilan State Executive Councillor. Nicole Tan initiated the setting up of a transit home called Rumah Minda Ceria (RMC) for the homeless in NS and the NS Food Bank under her portfolio on 27 June 2018. She was elected as the Ketua Wanita Pakatan Harapan NS on 10th Oct 2020.

In 2018, Nicole Tan initiated Power House Wanita Gemilang (PH GEM), an initiative of Negri Sembilan Pakatan Harapan, has a fund of RM1.6 million to be used for programmes to empower and develop women in the state in the following fields – human rights, education, health, environment and socio-economy. She also opened a free market called the Kedai Muhibah Raya (KMR) which is an initiative giving free clothes to anyone in need. KMR is also a branch of the Pusat Khidmat DUN Bukit Kepayang.

Election results

References 

Living people
People from Negeri Sembilan
Malaysian people of Chinese descent
Democratic Action Party (Malaysia) politicians
21st-century Malaysian politicians
Members of the Negeri Sembilan State Legislative Assembly
Negeri Sembilan state executive councillors
Malaysian people of Teochew descent
1971 births
Women MLAs in Negeri Sembilan
21st-century Malaysian women politicians